The 2019 Digital Ally 400 was a Monster Energy NASCAR Cup Series race held on May 11, 2019, at Kansas Speedway in Kansas City, Kansas. Contested over 271 laps—extended from 267 laps due to an overtime finish, on the 1.5 mile (2.4 km) asphalt speedway, it was the 12th race of the 2019 Monster Energy NASCAR Cup Series season. Brad Keselowski won the race, his third of the season and 30th career victory overall.

Report

Background

Kansas Speedway is a  tri-oval race track in Kansas City, Kansas. It was built in 2001 and hosts two annual NASCAR race weekends. The NTT IndyCar Series also raced there until 2011. The speedway is owned and operated by the International Speedway Corporation.

Entry list

Practice

First practice

Final practice

Qualifying

Qualifying results

 Eleven cars failed post-qualifying inspection and started at the rear, including 5 of the top 8 qualifiers (Nos. 10, 41, 9, 19, 42, 13, 22, 34, 00, 46, 66).

Race

Stage results

Stage One
Laps: 80

Stage Two
Laps: 80

Final stage results

Stage Three
Laps: 107

Race statistics
 Lead changes: 23 among 12 different drivers
 Cautions/Laps: 7 for 41
 Red flags: 0
 Time of race: 3 hours, 6 minutes and 9 seconds
 Average speed:

Media

Television
Fox Sports covered their ninth race at the Kansas Speedway. Mike Joy, three-time Kansas winner Jeff Gordon and Darrell Waltrip called in the booth for the race. Jamie Little, Regan Smith and Matt Yocum handled the action on pit road for the television side.

Radio
MRN had the radio call for the race which was also simulcasted on Sirius XM NASCAR Radio. Alex Hayden, Jeff Striegle and Rusty Wallace called the race in the booth when the field raced through the tri-oval. Dave Moody covered the race from the Sunoco spotters stand outside turn 2 when the field is racing through turns 1 and 2. Mike Bagley called the race from a platform outside turn 4. Jason Toy, Kim Coon, and Steve Post worked pit road for the radio side.

Standings after the race

Drivers' Championship standings

Manufacturers' Championship standings

Note: Only the first 16 positions are included for the driver standings.
. – Driver has clinched a position in the Monster Energy NASCAR Cup Series playoffs.

References

2019 in sports in Kansas
2019 Monster Energy NASCAR Cup Series
May 2019 sports events in the United States
NASCAR races at Kansas Speedway